Tom McNamara may refer to:
Tom McNamara (Gaelic footballer) (1872–1944), Irish Gaelic footballer
Tom McNamara (footballer, born 1874) (1874–1936), Australian rules footballer for St Kilda
Tom McNamara (golfer) (1882–1939), American golfer
Tom McNamara (director) (1886–1964), American film director
Tom McNamara (baseball) (1895–1974), American baseball player
Tom McNamara (American football) (1897–1966), American football player
Tom McNamara (politician) (born 1983), American politician, current mayor of Rockford, Illinois
Tom McNamara (footballer, born 1990), Australian rules footballer for Melbourne

See also
Thomas McNamara (disambiguation)